Antoine Lahad  (1927 – 10 September 2015) was the leader of the South Lebanon Army (SLA) from 1984 until 2000, when the army withdrew from Southern Lebanon and was dissolved.

Early life
Born into a Maronite Catholic family in 1927 in the village of Kfar Qatra, Chouf District. He graduated from the Lebanese Military Academy in 1952.

Military career
Lahad took control of the SLA in 1984, following the death of Saad Haddad the founder of the SLA. After several meetings with many political leaders in Lebanon from all religions he agreed to take on the problematic south because his career and stature would allow him to hold together an army from all the Lebanese religions. Lahad was a Lebanese Army major general who was close to the Lebanese President, Camille Chamoun, a Maronite.

Military career in the SLA 

While commanding the SLA General Lahad formed three regiments mainly from Druze, Shia and Christians who fought together to take back control of Lebanese territory from all the Palestinian factions who controlled much of southern Lebanon. During his service he never cut contact with the capital and all leaders from all political factions and religions kept visiting him asking him for help on several matters. He re-instated the salaries of the Lebanese army soldiers in the south which had previously been cut off. He built three major hospitals in Hasbaya, Marjyoun and Nabatieh and rejuvenated the economy of southern Lebanon which was historically left to its own devices by all Lebanese central governments.

After stabilizing the south the conflict with Hezbollah took center stage, until the unilateral withdrawal of Israel from southern Lebanon. It is worth noting that the whole withdrawal happened without a single shot being fired or any casualties being recorded on either the Israeli or the Hezbollah side.

Trouble with Lebanon and Hezbollah 
Lahad was condemned to death by Hezbollah following Israel's occupation of southern Lebanon. Men were required to sign written pledges not to visit with Lahad or his people if they were traveling into southern Lebanon. His headquarters were at Marjayoun, which flew an Israeli flag flanked by two flags of Lebanon. Also in the compound was the Pat Robertson CBN broadcast center.

Assassination attempt
In 1988, Souha Bechara, a 21-year-old woman, tried to assassinate Lahad. She had been raised in the Eastern Orthodox Church and had become a member of the Communist party. She was tasked with assassinating Lahad. Bechara disguised herself as an aerobics instructor to visit with Lahad's family. On November 7, 1988, while she was having tea with Lahad's wife, he returned home. Bechara shot him twice in the chest. She was detained by his security team. Lahad spent eight weeks in the hospital and suffered health complications leaving his left arm paralyzed. Upon his return to service he pardoned and released Souha Bechara after the Lebanese and French government pleaded with him to do so, and after she spent ten years in Khiam prison and suffered six years of solitary confinement in a tiny cell.

Israeli withdrawal
When Israel withdrew from southern Lebanon in 2000, Lahad was determined to carry on against Hezbollah. He pleaded for support from Israel:

SLA collapse

Lahad never received the support he asked for, and the SLA collapsed following Israel's withdrawal. At the time, Lahad was in Paris trying to convince the French authorities to send troops to replace his army because he always wanted and supported the peaceful implementation of the UN resolution 425.

He came to Israel after the remainder of the SLA disintegrated. In Lebanon, Lahad was sentenced to death for treason in absentia in case he ever returned. In a meeting with the Israeli Government Coordinator, Uri Lubrani, in May 2000, Lahad expressed deep concern surrounding the appropriate treatment of SLA members who ended up in Israel following the withdrawal. Contrary to contemporary media reports, Lahad stated that Israeli Prime Minister, Ehud Barak, had not tricked him. He highlighted the importance of his country's cooperation with Israel and cited the United Nations Security Council resolution 425 as a legitimate reason for Barak's withdrawal of Israeli armed forces. Lubrani assured Lahad that SLA members would receive appropriate treatment and thanked him and his men for their "long struggle for peace". Soon afterwards Lahad went to France to meet up with his family. Despite having family members living in France, the French authorities denied him permission to live in the country.

Retirement to Israel and death
After being refused the right to settle in France, Lahad moved to Israel. He released a Hebrew language autobiography in 2004, entitled, In the Midst of a Storm: An Autobiography.

In November 2006, Lahad had an interview with Ynet. He asserted his opinion that Syria was behind the assassination of Lebanese Industry Minister Pierre Amine Gemayel, 

In May 2014, a Lebanese court sentenced him to death in absentia for High Treason, Intelligence with the Enemy and Accessory to Kidnapping, Violence and Murder.

Lahad died in Paris on 10 September 2015 from a heart attack.

Footnotes

References
Lahad, Antoine. In the Midst of a Storm: an Autobiography (Tel Aviv: Yedioth Ahronoth Publ. 2004), ed. Estelle Golan. In Hebrew. 
Ynetnews, Interview with Antoine Lahad, 26 November 2006. 
Harald List: Antoine Lahad. in: ORIENT 2/88 p. 179-187. Biography in German.
Hussein Assi: LF Seeks to Pass "Amnesty" for Antoine Lahd and Company!. in: Al-Manar TV 19 March 2009 
Augustus Richard Norton: Hizballah and the Israeli Withdrawal from Southern Lebanon. in: Journal of Palestine Studies, Vol. 30, No. 1 (Autumn, 2000), pp. 22–35 
Professor M. Kahl: Baraq's Betrayal of Israel and Israel's Lebanese Allies. in: LFP 2001 
David Hirst: South Lebanon: The War that Never Ends?. in: Journal of Palestine Studies. Vol. 28, No. 3 (Spring, 1999), pp. 5–18. 
"Le Crépuscule de l'ALS", interview by Michel Zlotowski in Politique internationale. In French. 
"ISRAEL: LEBANON COORDINATOR LUBRANI MEETS GENERAL LAHAD." IPR Strategic Business Information Database (May 28, 2000): NA. General OneFile. Gale. University of Michigan - Ann Arbor. 7 Apr. 2009
 ITOF.
 BBC report.

External links
SLA.Miniature

1927 births
2015 deaths
Autobiographers
Lebanese emigrants to Israel
Lebanese Maronites
People convicted of treason
People from Chouf District
People sentenced to death in absentia